Golden State Transit Corp v City of Los Angeles, 475 U.S. 608 (1986), is a US labor law case, concerning the scope of federal preemption against state law for labor rights.

Facts
Golden State Transit Corp claimed that the City of Los Angeles was preempted by the National Labor Relations Act of 1935 from refusing to renew its franchise license to operate taxicabs in the city. During its application, its cab drivers went on strike for higher wages and better working conditions. The Teamsters Union put pressure on the City to not renew the license. Because the dispute was not settled, the franchise expired. The Federal District Court held that the City was entitled to not renew the license. The Court of Appeals affirmed this judgment. Golden State Transit Corp appealed.

Judgment
A majority of the Supreme Court held that Los Angeles was not entitled to refuse to renew a taxi company's franchise license because the Teamsters Union had pressured it not to until a dispute was resolved. Blackmun J gave the judgment.

Rehnquist J dissented, saying the following.

See also

United States labor law

References

External links
 

United States labor case law
1986 in United States case law
United States Supreme Court cases
United States Supreme Court cases of the Burger Court